The 1887 Georgetown football team represented the Georgetown University during the 1887 college football season.  Georgetown's official records do not include any games prior to 1887, despite other sources and old media guides showing games for at least three prior seasons.  These games mark the Georgetown's first games that took place on campus, as all sources indicate previous matchups were at their opponents.

Schedule

References

Georgetown
Georgetown Hoyas football seasons
Georgetown football